Automeris iris, the iris eyed silkmoth, is a species of insect in the family Saturniidae. It is found in Central America and North America.

The MONA or Hodges number for Automeris iris is 7747.

Subspecies
These two subspecies belong to the species Automeris iris:
 Automeris iris hesselorum Ferguson, 1972
 Automeris iris iris (Walker, 1865)

References

Further reading

 
 
 

Hemileucinae
Articles created by Qbugbot
Moths described in 1865